George Horne may refer to:
 George Horne (bishop) (1730–1792), Church of England bishop
 George Horne (ice hockey) (1904–1929), Canadian ice hockey player
 George Horne (politician) (1811–1873), politician in the electoral district of Warrnambool, Victoria, Australia
 George Horne (rugby union) (born 1995), Scottish rugby union player

See also
 George Henry Horn (1840–1897), American entomologist